Disney Tsum Tsum Festival is a party video game for Nintendo Switch developed by B.B. Studio and Hyde, and published by Bandai Namco Entertainment. It is the first console game to be based on the Disney Tsum Tsum toyline. It was released in Japan on October 10, 2019, and globally on November 8.

Gameplay
Disney Tsum Tsum Festival features various Disney and Pixar characters rendered in Tsum Tsum form, as well as a Tsum Tsum version of Bandai Namco's mascot Pac-Man. The game has players play a variety of minigames in single-player, cooperative multiplayer, and competitive multiplayer, with up to four players playing online or on the same Switch console. Minigames include curling and "bubble hockey" (air hockey), among others. Festival also features a version of the original Disney Tsum Tsum mobile puzzle game originally developed by Line Corporation, making use of the Switch's touch screen held in portrait mode. The puzzle game also features two-player local or online multiplayer.

Marketing
Disney Tsum Tsum Festival was announced in February 2019, during a Nintendo Direct presentation. The game was released in Japan on October 10, which also saw the release of a Nintendo Switch bundle featuring a limited edition Tsum Tsum-themed console, dock, and Joy-Con (with a Mickey Mouse head-shaped Home button on the Joy-Con R); the Disney Tsum Tsum Festival game, and a code for downloadable content featuring alternate "Festival" versions of the Stitch, Mickey Mouse, Minnie Mouse, and Winnie the Pooh Tsum Tsums (which are featured on the Switch console and dock).

Reception

Disney Tsum Tsum Festival received mixed to positive reception from critics, with an aggregated review score of 63 on Metacritic based on fourteen reviews.

References

External links
 
 Official trailer

2019 video games
Party video games
Nintendo Switch games
Nintendo Switch-only games
Bandai Namco games
Video games developed in Japan
Disney video games
Pac-Man